The different types of listening skills used in human communication include: However, in addition to the acoustic message, visual stimuli would also be processed, as well as information about the sound source and the social situation.
 Active listening
 Appreciative listening
 Dialogic listening
 Informative listening
 Reflective listening
 Workplace listening

References

Interpersonal communication